Munde Kamaal De is a 2015 Indian Punjabi-language comedy film directed by Amit Prasher and written by Naresh Kathooria  The film is produced by Prem Parkash Gupta with Starring Amrinder Gill, Yuvraj Hans, Binnu Dhillon and Mandy Takhar in the lead. The film was released 21 August 2015. Movie is produced under banner SRD Motion Pictures. 
Munde Kamaal De revolves around three characters who are blind deaf and mute. It revolves around their love life and the troubles brought upon by their disabilities.

Cast
Amrinder Gill as Vikram
Yuvraj Hans as Rocky
Binnu Dhillon as Tinku
Prabhjeet Kaur as Kajal
Mandy Takhar as Sonia 
Jaswinder Bhalla as Balwant Singh Sidhu
B.N. Sharma as Sikander
Karamjit Anmol as Bunty
Avtar Gill as Tiwana
Raghveer Boli as Babli

Soundtrack
The music was composed by Farzan Faaiz, Jaison Thind, Jassi Katyal, Gurmoh and released by Moviebank-L.

Reception

Critical response
ABP Sanjha also gave positive review to the movie. Divya Pal of CNN-IBN gave ratings of 1.5/5 to the film. Myballewood.com gave it 3.5/5.

Box office
The film had poor opening at the domestic box office as its first week is netted around 1.94 crores.

References

External links 
 

2015 films
Punjabi-language Indian films
2010s Punjabi-language films
Films scored by Farzan Faaiz
Films scored by Jassi Katyal